Fishing Village/Kukum is a suburb of Honiara, Solomon Islands, and is located east of the main center and west of Panatina.

References

Populated places in Guadalcanal Province
Suburbs of Honiara